The Royal Academy of Music Bach Prize is an award given by the Royal Academy of Music in London.  It is sponsored by the Kohn Foundation, and given to performers and scholars who have made an outstanding contribution to the music of Johann Sebastian Bach. The prize is worth £10,000 and the panel of the prize consists of the principal of the Royal Academy of Music, a previous winner of the prize and Ralph Kohn.

Recipients
 2006: Christoph Wolff 
 2007: Sir András Schiff 
 2008: Sir John Eliot Gardiner 
 2009: Peter Schreier 
 2010: John Butt 
 2011: Thomanerchor Leipzig
 2012: Masaaki Suzuki
 2013: Murray Perahia
 2014: Ton Koopman
 2015: Rachel Podger
 2016: Philippe Herreweghe

References 

Royal Academy of Music
Classical music awards
Awards established in 2006
2006 establishments in the United Kingdom
British music awards
Johann Sebastian Bach